The Williamsport Demorest Bicycle Boys were a minor league baseball team located in Williamsport, Pennsylvania. They played in the Central Pennsylvania League in 1896 and 1897. The team's roster included Ossee Schrecongost and George Stovey.

References

Demorest Bicycle Boys
Defunct minor league baseball teams
1896 establishments in Pennsylvania
1897 disestablishments in Pennsylvania
Baseball teams established in 1896
Baseball teams disestablished in 1897
Defunct baseball teams in Pennsylvania